Kaulana Noa (born December 29, 1976) is a former an American football offensive guard. He was drafted by the St. Louis Rams in the fourth round of the 2000 NFL Draft with the 104th overall pick.

College career
Noa was a four-year starter, primarily at right tackle at the University of Hawaii, lettering each year from 1996 through 1999.

Professional career

Pre-draft

St. Louis Rams
Noa was on the St. Louis Rams practice squad in 2000 and 2001.

References

External links

1976 births
Living people
American football offensive guards
St. Louis Rams players
People from Hawaii (island)
Players of American football from Hawaii